Once Upon a Classic was an American television program hosted by Bill Bixby. The program aired on PBS from 1976 to 1980 as a production of WQED in Pittsburgh.

The episodes consisted of adaptations of such classic literature as A Connecticut Yankee in King Arthur's Court (which won a Peabody Award), Leatherstocking Tales, The Talisman, and The Prince and the Pauper; some of these adaptations were produced by other broadcasters such as the BBC and ITV in the United Kingdom. There were also some original teleplays.

References

External links

PBS original programming
Television shows based on novels
1970s American children's television series
1980s American children's television series
1976 American television series debuts
1980 American television series endings
1970s American anthology television series
1980s American anthology television series